Philip of Burgundy (10 November 1323 – 10 August 1346) was Count of Auvergne and Boulogne (as Philip I) in right of his wife. He died during the Siege of Aiguillon.

Biography
Philip, born 10 November 1323, was the only son and heir of Odo IV, Duke of Burgundy, and of Joan III, Countess of Burgundy, daughter of King Philip V of France and Joan II, Countess of Burgundy.

In 1340, Philip and his father defended the city of Saint-Omer against the assaults of Robert III of Artois. In 1346, he participated in the siege of Aiguillon, led by John, Duke of Normandy. It was during this siege that Philip died, after falling from his horse.

Philip had no other sons from his marriage to Joan, the House of Burgundy was then placed in the hands of his young son Philip (1346–1361), who died childless. After the death of the younger Philip, the dukedom of Burgundy became a part of the French crown, and was granted by John II of France to his youngest son, Philip the Bold.

Philip's daughter, Joan (134411 September 1360), was betrothed to Amadeus VI, Count of Savoy from 1347 to 1355, and was raised at his court.  When she was released from the engagement at age 10, she entered a convent at Poissy, where she remained for her final years.

References

Sources

See also
Duchy of Burgundy
Dukes of Burgundy family tree
List of horse accidents

1323 births
1346 deaths
House of Burgundy
Counts of Boulogne
House of Capet
Deaths by horse-riding accident in France
Jure uxoris officeholders